The Thebaid or Thebais  (Thēbais), also called the Cyclic Thebaid, is an Ancient Greek epic poem of uncertain authorship (see Cyclic poets) sometimes attributed by early writers to Homer, for example, by the poet Callinus and the historian Herodotus. It told the story of the war between the brothers Eteocles and Polynices, and was regarded as forming part of a Theban Cycle. Only fragments of the text survive.

See also 
Thebaid (Latin poem)

Select editions and translations

Critical editions
 .
 .
 .
 .

Translations
 . (The link is to the 1st edition of 1914.) English translation with facing Greek text; now obsolete except for its translations of the ancient quotations.
 . Greek text with facing English translation

Bibliography
 .

References

8th-century BC books
8th-century BC poems
Theban Cycle
Ancient Greek epic poems
Lost poems
Homer

ja:テーバイド